American Museum Novitates is a peer-reviewed academic journal published by the American Museum of Natural History. It was established in 1921. According to the Journal Citation Reports, the journal has a 2013 impact factor of 1.636.

References

External links 
 

Publications established in 1921
Open access journals
American Museum of Natural History
English-language journals
Zoology journals
Paleontology journals
Geology journals
Academic journals published by museums
1921 establishments in the United States